The Khambuwan National Front is a political party in Nepal, which supports the formation of the ethnic state of Khambuwan for the Rai people. It is led by Ram Kumar Rai and Rajan Rai (R.K.Khambu and Rajan Bantawa).

The Khambuwan National Front won one seat in the 2013 Nepalese Constituent Assembly election.

References

External links
 Official party website

Political parties in Nepal
2008 establishments in Nepal